Maui High School is a public high school founded in 1913 in Hamakuapoko, a sugarcane plantation town on the island of Maui in Hawaii. In 1972, the school moved to its new location in Kahului, Hawaii.

Old Maui High School

The original school was founded in 1913. Early students arrived to school via horse and buggy or the now defunct Kahului Railroad. The old school site, at  includes the campus's centerpiece administration building, built in 1921 and designed by architect Charles William Dickey, which fell into disrepair. The site was nominated to the State and National Register of Historic Places. Work to restore the campus was started in 2004 by community organizations including the Friends of Old Maui High and Community Work Day. The campus boasts the sculptures A Path Through the Trees by Satoru Abe, Growing by Toshiko Takaezu, and Carolina by Thomas Woodruff.

Today's Maui High 
The new campus was built in 1972 at 660 South Lono Avenue in Kahului. In 2009, Maui High School had an approximate enrollment of 1816 students, and 123 faculty. Students from the 8th grade class of Maui Waena Intermediate School and Lokelani Intermediate School are scheduled to attend Maui High if they reside in Kihei or Kahului. The school mascot is the sabers and the school colors are royal blue and white.

With 120 members in the 2012–2013 school year, the marching band and color guard is Maui High School's largest student-body organization. The award-winning Sabers have performed at Disneyland, the Tournament of Roses Parade in January 2009 and 2015, and on the TV show The Office. In November 2017, the Maui High School marching band and color guard performed at the Bands of America Grand National Championship at Lucas Oil Stadium in Indianapolis, Indiana.

Notable alumni
 Alan Arakawa, Maui County mayor
Elmer Cravalho, Maui County mayor and member of the Hawaii House of Representatives
Gilbert Keith-Agaran, member of both chambers of the Hawaii State Legislature
Patsy Mink, first Asian-American woman elected to U.S. House of Representatives
Zach Scott, former professional footballer for Seattle Sounders FC
 Hannibal Tavares, Maui County mayor
 Shan S. Tsutsui, former lieutenant governor of Hawaii; former president of the Hawaii Senate

Athletics
Maui High School has a variety of athletic opportunities for its students, including basketball, cheerleading, judo, paddling, track and field, swimming and diving, tennis, golf, cross country, wrestling, riflery, football, baseball, soccer, women's water polo, and softball. In order to participate in athletic opportunities, a student must maintain a grade-point average of 2.0 throughout a sport's season. On April 29, 2017, Maui High School won the HHSAA Division 1 Baseball Championship by beating Waiakea 6 to 1, thereby bringing the title back to Maui for the first time in 35 years.

HHSAA Championships
1995	Track & Field - Boys	
1994	Boys Golf	
1993	Boys Golf	
1988	Boys Golf	
1987	Track & Field - Boys	
1982	Baseball	
1977	Boys Golf
2017   Baseball
2018   Boys Cross Country

In 2008 Maui High won the Maui Interscholastic League Championships in Cross-Country.

Academics

Since 1990, Maui High School has had a large boom in academic successes. The Sabers remain one of only two public high schools in Hawaii to win the regional competition of the National Science Bowl (a total of four times) and one of only two public schools in Hawaii to win the regional National Ocean Sciences Bowl competitions (a total of four times).

In two years, Maui High ranked fifth then sixth at the national competition of the National Ocean Sciences Bowl - a feat unmatched by any Hawaii school until 2010 by the team from Punahou school (which finished fifth).

Maui High has also had great success in sending students to the national olympiads of various subjects. A number of three and four year qualifiers for the National Chemistry Olympiad and National Physics Olympiad have passed through the school.

The school has also produced a number of finalists in the Intel International Science and Engineering Fair. In recent years, 3rd- and 4th-place awards have been given to Maui High finalists in the physics category, in addition to one student receiving an all-expense-paid trip to the European Organization for Nuclear Research.

The school robotics team (2443, The Blue Thunder) is another point of pride for the school. Created in 2006, the team has currently participated in three seasons with the FIRST Robotics Competition, as well as with the VEX Robotics Competition. Two separate VEX teams flying the 2443 banner qualified for the 2010 Dallas World Championships, and the 2443 FIRST team competed in the Atlanta, Georgia FIRST Championship in 2009.

Since 2010, Maui High has been using Senior Projects as a graduation requirement.

Band
The Maui High School's Saber Marching Band & Color Guard participated in the 2015 Rose Parade in Pasadena, California.

References

External links

 
 
 

Public high schools in Maui
Educational institutions established in 1913
1913 establishments in Hawaii